The Protestant work ethic, also known as the Calvinist work ethic or the Puritan work ethic, is a work ethic concept in scholarly sociology, economics and historiography. It emphasizes that diligence, discipline, and frugality are a result of a person's subscription to the values espoused by the Protestant faith, particularly Calvinism.

The phrase was initially coined in 1905 by Max Weber in his book The Protestant Ethic and the Spirit of Capitalism. Weber asserted that Protestant ethics and values, along with the Calvinist doctrines of asceticism and predestination, enabled the rise and spread of capitalism. It is one of the most influential and cited books in sociology, although the thesis presented has been controversial since its release. In opposition to Weber, historians such as Fernand Braudel and Hugh Trevor-Roper assert that the Protestant work ethic did not create capitalism and that capitalism developed in pre-Reformation Catholic communities. Just as priests and caring professionals are deemed to have a vocation (or "calling" from God) for their work, according to the Protestant work ethic the "lowly" workman also has a noble vocation which he can fulfill through dedication to his work.

The concept is often credited with helping to define the societies of Northern, Central and Northwestern Europe as well as the United States of America.

Basis in Protestant theology 

Protestants, beginning with Martin Luther, conceptualized worldly work as a duty which benefits both the individual and society as a whole. Thus, the Catholic idea of good works was transformed into an obligation to consistently work diligently as a sign of grace. Whereas Catholicism teaches that good works are required of Catholics as a necessary manifestation of the faith they received, and that faith apart from works is dead and barren, the Calvinist theologians taught that only those who were predestined to be saved would be saved.

For Protestants, salvation is a gift from God; this is the Protestant distinction of sola gratia. In light of salvation being a gift of grace, Protestants viewed work as stewardship given to them. Thus Protestants were not working in order to achieve salvation but viewed work as the means by which they could be a blessing to others. Hard work and frugality were thought to be two important applications of being a steward of what God had given them.  Protestants were thus attracted to these qualities and strove to reach them.

There are many specific theological examples in the Bible that support Protestant theology. Old Testament examples abound, such as God's command in Exodus 20:8-10 to "Remember the Sabbath day, to keep it holy. Six days you shall labor, and do all your work, but the seventh day is a Sabbath to the Lord your God." Another passage from the Book of Proverbs in the Old Testament provides an example: "A little sleep, a little slumber, a little folding of the hands to rest, and poverty will come upon you like a robber, and want like an armed man."

The New Testament also provides many examples, such as the Parable of the Ten Minas in the Book of Luke.

The Apostle Paul in 2 Thessalonians said "If anyone is not willing to work, let him not eat."

Protestant theology shares its origins with other and older Judeo-Christian theologies, if for no other reason than that it shares some of the same source documents.

American political history

The first permanent English Settlement in America in the 17th century, at Jamestown, was led by John Smith. He trained the first English settlers to work at farming and fishing. These settlers were ill-equipped to survive in the  English settlements in the early 1600's and were on the precipice of dying. John Smith emphasized the Protestant Work Ethic and helped propagate it by stating "He that will not work, shall not eat" which is a direct reference to 2 Thessalonians 3:10. This policy is credited with helping the early colony survive and thrive in its relatively harsh environment.

Writer Frank Chodorov argued that the Protestant ethic was long considered indispensable for American political figures:

Support

Some support exists that the Protestant Work Ethic may be so ingrained in American culture that when it appears people may not even recognize it. This may be due to the fact that ethics may be difficult to measure. Due to the history of Protestantism in the United States, it may be difficult to separate the successes of the country from the ethic that may have significantly contributed to propelling it.

The original New England Colonies in 1677 were mostly Protestant in origin and thus were subject to the ethic. 

There are some examples of scholarly work which support that the ethic has had a significant effect on some modern societies. Work at the University of Groningen supports this effect. Other empirical research provides positive correlations as well.

Recent scholarly work by Lawrence Harrison, Samuel P. Huntington, and David Landes has revitalized interest in Weber's thesis. In a New York Times article, published on June 8, 2003, Niall Ferguson pointed out that data from the Organisation for Economic Co-operation and Development (OECD) seems to confirm that "the experience of Western Europe in the past quarter-century offers an unexpected confirmation of the Protestant ethic".

Tshilidzi Marwala asserted in 2020 that the principles of Protestant ethic are important for development in Africa and that they should be secularized and used as an alternative to the ethic of Prosperity Christianity, which advocates miracles as a basis of development.

Criticism

Joseph Schumpeter argued that capitalism began in Italy in the 14th century, not in the Protestant areas of Europe.  Other factors that further developed the European market economy included the strengthening of property rights and lowering of transaction costs with the decline and monetization of feudalism, and the increase in real wages following the epidemics of bubonic plague.

Economists Sascha Becker and Ludger Wößmann have posited an alternate theory, claiming that the literacy gap between Protestants (as a result of the Reformation) and Catholics was sufficient explanation for the economic gaps, and that the "results hold when we exploit the initial concentric dispersion of the Reformation to use distance to Wittenberg as an instrument for Protestantism". However, they also note that, between Luther (1500) and Prussia during the Franco-Prussian War (1871), the limited data available has meant that the period in question is regarded as a "black box" and that only "some cursory discussion and analysis" is possible.

Historian Fernand Braudel wrote that "all historians" opposed the "tenuous theory" of Protestant ethic, despite not being able to entirely quash the theory "once and for all". Braudel continues to remark that the "northern countries took over the place that earlier had been so long and brilliantly been occupied by the old capitalist centers of the Mediterranean. They invented nothing, either in technology or business management".

Social scientist Rodney Stark commented that "during their critical period of economic development, these northern centers of capitalism were Catholic, not Protestant", with the Reformation still far off in the future. Furthermore, he also highlighted the conclusions of other historians, noting that, compared to Catholics, Protestants were "not more likely to hold the high-status capitalist positions", that Catholic Europe did not lag in its industrial development compared to Protestant areas, and that even Weber wrote that "fully developed capitalism had appeared in Europe" long before the Reformation. As British historian Hugh Trevor-Roper stated, the concept that "large-scale industrial capitalism was ideologically impossible before the Reformation is exploded by the simple fact that it existed".

Andersen et al found that the location of monasteries of the Catholic Order of Cistercians, and specifically their density, highly correlated to this work ethic in later centuries; ninety percent of these monasteries were founded before the year 1300 AD. Joseph Henrich found that this correlation extends right up to the twenty-first century.

Pastor John Starke writes that the Protestant work ethic "multiplied myths about Protestantism, Calvinism, vocation, and capitalism. To this day, many believe Protestants work hard so as to build evidence for salvation." Others have connected the concept of a Protestant work ethic to racist ideals. Civil rights activist Martin Luther King Jr. said:

See also

Achievement ideology
Anglo-Saxon economy
Critical responses to Weber
Critique of work

Imperial German influence on Republican Chile
Industrial Revolution
Laziness
Merton thesis
Pray and work
Predestination in Calvinism

Prussian virtues
Refusal of work
Sloth (deadly sin)
Underclass

Notes

References

Further reading 
 Sascha O. Becker and Ludger Wossmann. "Was Weber Wrong? A Human Capital Theory of Protestant Economics History". Munich Discussion Paper No. 2007-7, January 22, 2007. 
 
 Robert Green, editor. The Weber Thesis Controversy. D.C. Heath, 1973, covers some of the criticism of Weber's theory.
 
 Haller, William. "Milton and the Protestant Ethic." Journal of British Studies 1.1 (1961): 52-57 [www.jstor.org/stable/175098 online].
 
 Max Weber. The Protestant Ethic and the Spirit of Capitalism. Chas. Scribner's sons, 1959.
Van Hoorn, André, and Robbert Maseland. "Does a Protestant work ethic exist? Evidence from the well-being effect of unemployment." Journal of Economic Behavior & Organization 91 (2013): 1-12.

External links

Work ethic
Max Weber
Sociological theories
Economy and Christianity
Christian ethics
Work